is a private women's college in Nada, Kobe, Hyōgo, Japan. Kobe Kaisei institution was first founded as a primary school, a junior and senior high school in 1951. Moreover, the junior college was established in 1955, followed by the opening of Kobe Kaisei College in 1965.

Kobe Kaisei College focuses on the humanities education based on Christianity. In addition they provide good English and French education. A number of alumni have been noticed for their ability to speak foreign languages in the industries.

Kobe Kaisei is well known for being one of the most honorable schools. Therefore, most of students come from good families.

External links

 Official website 

Educational institutions established in 1955
Private universities and colleges in Japan
Universities and colleges in Hyōgo Prefecture
1955 establishments in Japan
Catholic universities and colleges in Japan
Women's universities and colleges in Japan